Roberto Tucci, SJ (19 April 1921 – 14 April 2015) was a Jesuit cardinal and theologian. He was created cardinal by Pope John Paul II on 21 February 2001.

Life 
Cardinal Tucci was born in Naples, Italy in 1921 and entered the Society of Jesus on 1 October 1936. He studied classics at the University of Naples, where he also eventually received a doctorate in philosophy. He subsequently earned a licentiate in sacred theology from the Pontifical University of Louvain and a doctorate in sacred theology from the Pontifical Gregorian University in Rome. 

He was ordained on 24 August 1950. After his ordination he taught as a faculty member at the Theological Seminary of "San Luigi" in Naples. He founded the journal Digest religioso, which was later renamed Rassegna di Teologia. He later worked a member of the preparatory commission on lay apostolate of the Second Vatican Council.  He attended the Council as a peritus and was a member of the editorial committee of the Council's pastoral instruction on social communications "Communio et progressio" in its final phase. He was a consultor of the Pontifical Council for Social Communications from 1965 until 1989. 

He served as Secretary General of the Italian conference of the Society of Jesus from 1967 until 1969. He also worked for Vatican Radio and was its director general until 1985. He was also a member of the board of directors of Georgetown University, Washington from 1977 to 1983.

He was awarded the Légion d'honneur by France in 1976, and was granted an honorary degree in law by the University of Notre Dame.

According to papal biographer George Weigel, Cardinal Tucci was for many years a scheduler of papal overseas journeys.

Cardinal 
He was created Cardinal Deacon of Sant'Ignazio di Loyola a Campo Marzio in the consistory of 21 February 2001. He obtained from Pope John Paul II dispensation from the rule that all cardinals be ordained bishops. On 21 February 2011, he opted for the order of Cardinal Priest, with his former diaconal church elevated to the rank of titular church.

Tucci died on 14 April 2015 at the age of 93.

References

1921 births
2015 deaths
20th-century Italian Jesuits
21st-century Italian cardinals
Cardinals created by Pope John Paul II
Pontifical Gregorian University alumni
Jesuit cardinals
Clergy from Naples
La Civiltà Cattolica editors